The European Union and Yemen enjoy longstanding relations, which date back to 1997 when the first official cooperation agreement was signed. This relationship has kept growing ever since. In December 2009, the EU established a full diplomatic representation to the Republic of Yemen. Many EU Member States enjoy strong and historical relations with Yemen that date back to the 1930s. The United Kingdom, France, Germany and the Netherlands are among Yemen's main donors; France has far ranging economic relations while Italy was the first state to open diplomatic relations with Yemen. Seven Member States are represented in Sana’a: Bulgaria, France, Germany, Italy, the Netherlands, Spain and the United Kingdom.

History
In 1978 the European Commission began cooperation with Yemen and relations were formalised in 1984 through a Development Co-operation Agreement with North Yemen, which was extended in 1995 to cover the entire country following unification in 1990. In July 1998 an enhanced framework co-operation agreement focusing on commercial, development and economic issues came into force. The agreement provides the basis for a long-term contractual commitment between the Commission and Yemen.

Following the Arab Spring and the departure of Yemeni President Ali Abdullah Saleh, the European Parliament urged the High Representative to reassess ties to Yemen. While Parliament were supportive of the uprising, the High Representative concentrated on organising evacuation of EU citizens due to fear of civil war.

Trade
Yemen relied heavily on oil exports (90%). The EU is its second largest import partner, but only its fifth largest trading partner overall.

References

 
European Union
Third-country relations of the European Union